Cisarthron is a genus of tree-fungus beetle in the family Ciidae.

Species
 Cisarthron laevicolle Reitter, 1885

References

Ciidae genera